"Burn My Shadow" is a song by English electronic group UNKLE, featuring the vocals of Ian Astbury of The Cult. Despite its popularity on the band's album, War Stories and being used in several films, TV shows, promos and adverts, the song did poorly on the UK Singles Chart; peaking in at No.112  The music video was directed by Miguel Sapochnik and features actor Goran Višnjić.

Notable appearances
 Trailer for FUEL.
 Soundtrack for CSI: NY episode 414, "Playing with Matches".
 Trailer for Alone in the Dark: Inferno.
 Trailer for Assassin's Creed: Brotherhood.
 Soundtrack for Repo Men.
 Played in Season 1 Episode 19 of Person of Interest.
 TV advert for Mercedes-Benz.
 TV advert for Ford Focus
 Played at the credits of The Raven
 Several occasions on Top Gear
 Played in Season 1, Episode 7 of Dr. Death

Charts

Personnel

UNKLE
 James Lavelle - keyboards, production, piano
 Pablo Clements - engineering, mixing

Other musicians
 Ian Astbury (The Cult) - vocals, guitar
 Chris Goss - guitar
 Jeordie White (Twiggy Ramirez) - bass
 Dave Henderson - drums

References

2007 singles
Unkle songs
Trip hop songs
2007 songs
Songs written by Ian Astbury